Knotts is a surname. Notable people with the surname include:

 Armanis F. Knotts ( 1860–1937), American politician and lawyer
 Don Knotts (1924–2006), American comedic actor
 Gary Knotts (born 1977), American baseball player
 Howard Knotts, American flying ace during World War I
 Jake Knotts (born 1944), American politician
 Ricky Knotts (1951–1980), American ASA and NASCAR driver

See also
 United States v. Knotts, a 1983 United States Supreme Court case
 Knott's (disambiguation)
 Knott (disambiguation)